The 1988 Sharjah Cup was held in Sharjah, UAE, between March 25 and April 1, 1988. Three national teams took part: India, New Zealand and Sri Lanka.

The 1988 Sharjah Cup started with a round-robin tournament where each team played the other once. The leading team qualified for the final in a knock-out tournament while the second and third-placed team contested a semi-final for the right to contest the final.

India won the tournament and US$30,000 in prize money. A total of US$150,000 was disbursed in prize money, awards and benefits.

Matches

Group stage

Semi-final

Final

See also
 Sharjah Cup

References

 
 Cricket Archive: Sharjah Cup 1987/88
 ESPNCricinfo: Sharjah Cup, 1987/88
 

International cricket competitions from 1985–86 to 1988
Sharjah Cup, 1988
1988 in Emirati sport
International cricket competitions in the United Arab Emirates